Frederick Minion was an English professional footballer who played as a wing-half. He made two appearances in the Football League for Burnley.

References

Year of birth unknown
English footballers
Association football midfielders
Burnley F.C. players
English Football League players
Year of death missing